The Central Committee of the Lao People's Revolutionary Party (LPRP) is the highest decision-making organ in Laos when the National Congress is not in session.

History
The Central Committee was established at the 1st National Congress in 1955. At the 2nd LPRP National Congress, held on 3–6 February 1972, it established the Politburo and the Secretariat.

Terms

See also
 Lao People's Revolutionary Party
 Politburo of the Lao People's Revolutionary Party
 Secretariat of the Lao People's Revolutionary Party

References

Bibliography 
Books:
 

Central Committee of the Lao People's Revolutionary Party
1955 establishments in Laos